Voisines may refer to the following places in France:

Voisines, Haute-Marne, a commune in the Haute-Marne department 
Voisines, Yonne, a commune in the Yonne department